2020-2023 Parliament of Montenegro was convocation of the Parliament of Montenegro, elected in the 2020 parliamentary election.

History 

The first session of Parliament was held on 23 September 2020. The leader of Democratic Montenegro, Aleksa Bečić, was elected president. A parliamentary majority was also formed, consisting of coalitions of the ZBCG, MjNN and CnB. This is the first majority since independence that does not include the Democratic Party of Socialists.  Montenegrin President Milo Đukanović was not present at the session. 

All 41 opposition deputies nominated Zdravko Krivokapić as their candidate for the post of prime minister. After negotiations, Krivokapić Cabinet took office on 4 December 2020.

The government fell in a vote of no confidence on 4 February 2022, initiated by URA leader Dritan Abazović. On 28 April 2022, after parliamentary and government crisis, Parliament approved the Abazović Cabinet. A new parliament speaker, Danijela Đurović from the Socialist People's Party, was also elected.

On 20 August 2022, the Parliament of Montenegro passed a motion of no confidence against Abazović's government, which ended his premiership.

Current composition

References 

Politics of Montenegro
Current legislatures